George H. Hay RSA RSW (1831–1912) was a Scottish artist. His narrative paintings are often inspired by the works of Sir Walter Scott. In 1878 he founded the Royal Scottish Society of Painters in Watercolours.

Life

Hay was born at Prospect Bank House in Leith (Edinburgh's harbour town) in 1831.

He studied art under Robert Scott Lauder alongside William McTaggart, William Quiller Orchardson and Hugh Cameron. The latter became a close friend and they shared a studio at 12 Queen Street, Edinburgh from 1880.

In 1865 he was living at 16 Picardy Place at the head of Leith Walk.

He became an associate of the Royal Scottish Academy in 1869 and a full member in 1876. He was Secretary to the RSA from 1881 to 1907.

He moved to 9 Castle Terrace in 1884 but moved a year later to a Victorian terraced house at 7 Ravelston Terrace in west Edinburgh, where he lived for the rest of his life.

Known Works

The Student's Dream (1857)
Haymaking
The Pet
In a Rage
The Court of Mary Queen of Scots

References

1831 births
1912 deaths
People from Leith
Artists from Edinburgh